Gafatar is a religious sect and minority faith of Islam in West Kalimantan, Indonesia,  founded by Ahmad Moshaddeq. There are more than 7,000 members of Gafatar. In 2016, the Ministry of Home Affairs of Indonesia banned activities of Gafatar.

References 

Islam in Indonesia